The 2004–05 Libyan Premier League was the 37th edition of the Libyan Premier League, the top tier of Libyan football organised by the Libyan Football Federation. The season started on September 10, 2004, culminating on July 12, 2005. Al Ittihad secured their 11th league title, with newly promoted Urouba finishing as runners-up and champions Al Olomby only managing to finish 3rd.

Competition
The season contained 14 sides, who each played each other twice. However, after Nasr and Ahly Tripoli's expulsion from the league on May 9, 2005, all matches that were played against these two clubs were cancelled.

Teams

League table

Relegation play-offs
The promotion/relegation play-off took place between the 10th placed team Rafik Sorman and the 3rd placed team in the 2004-05 Libyan Second Division Playoffs, Al Wahda. A one-off match took place at the 9 July Stadium. The winner, Rafeeq, retained their top flight place for the next season, and Al Wahda remained in the Libyan Second Division for the 2005-06 season.

References

2004-05
Lib
1